Mike Sewak is an American former college football player and coach. He served as the head football coach at Georgia Southern University from 2002 to 2005, compiling a record of 35–14. He retired after the 2018 season as an assistant coach at the Georgia Institute of Technology.

Head coaching record

References

1958 births
Living people
American football offensive linemen
Georgia Southern Eagles football coaches
Georgia Tech Yellow Jackets football coaches
Hawaii Rainbow Warriors football coaches
Hobart Statesmen football coaches
Ohio Bobcats football coaches
Virginia Cavaliers football players